The 1932–33 season was the 41st season of The Football League.

Final league tables
Match results are drawn from The Rec.Sport.Soccer Statistics Foundation website and Rothmans for the First Division and from Rothmans for the Second Division and for the two Third Divisions.

From the 1922–23 season onwards, re-election was required of the bottom two teams of both the Third Division North and Third Division South leagues.

First Division

Results

Maps

Second Division

Results

Maps

Third Division North

Results

Maps

Third Division South

Results

Maps

See also
1932–33 in English football
1932 in association football
1933 in association football

References

Ian Laschke: Rothmans Book of Football League Records 1888–89 to 1978–79. Macdonald and Jane’s, London & Sydney, 1980.

English Football League seasons
Eng
1932–33 in English football leagues